Mathieu Biazizzo (born 11 July 1991) is a French slalom canoeist who has competed at the international level since 2009.

He won five medals at the ICF Canoe Slalom World Championships with two golds (K1 team: 2014, 2021), a silver (K1 team: 2017) and two bronzes (K1: 2014, K1 team: 2013). He also won a silver medal in the K1 team event at the 2017 European Championships in Tacen.

Biazizzo won the overall World Cup title in the K1 class in 2016.

World Cup individual podiums

References

External links

1991 births
French male canoeists
Living people
People from Conflans-Sainte-Honorine
Medalists at the ICF Canoe Slalom World Championships
Sportspeople from Yvelines